Erqiguangchang (literally "Erqi Square" or "February 7 Square") is the interchange station of Line 1 and Line 3, Zhengzhou Metro. It was opened on 28 December 2013 along with Line 1. The station lies beneath the Erqi Square in downtown Zhengzhou.

Usage
The usage of the station is very high since it serves one of the most crowded commercial area in Zhengzhou, with many shopping malls and department stores around. It is the station with the highest passenger volume in Zhengzhou metro system as of April 2018.

Station layout 
The station has 3 floors underground. The B1 floor is for the station concourse and the B2 and B3 floors are for the platforms and tracks of Line 1 and Line 3 respectively. The station has one island platform and two tracks for Line 1 and one island platform, one side platform and two tracks for Line 3.

Exits

Surroundings
Erqi Memorial Tower (二七纪念塔)
Dehua Pedestrian Street (德化步行街)
Hualian Department Store (华联商厦)
MixC Zhengzhou (郑州万象城)
David Plaza (大卫城)

References

Stations of Zhengzhou Metro
Line 1, Zhengzhou Metro
Line 3, Zhengzhou Metro
Railway stations in China opened in 2013